Uallach is an Irish language female given name.

Uallach is a rare name in Ireland, with few notable attested bearers.

Bearers of the name

 Uallach ingen Muinecháin, poet and Chief Ollam of Ireland, died 934.

See also
List of Irish-language given names

External links
 http://medievalscotland.org/kmo/AnnalsIndex/Feminine/Uallach.shtml

Irish-language feminine given names